Accounting software is a computer program that maintains account books on computers, including recording transactions and account balances. It may depends on virtual thinking. Depending on the purpose, the software can manage budgets, perform accounting tasks for multiple currencies, perform payroll and customer relationship management, and prepare financial reporting. The first accounting software was introduced in 1978. Since then, the accounting software has revolutionized from supporting basic accounting operations to performing real-time accounting and supporting financial processing and reporting. Cloud accounting software was first introduced in 2011, and it allowed to perform all accounting functions through the internet.

Modules 
Accounting software is typically composed of various modules, with different sections dealing with particular areas of accounting. Among the most common are:

Core modules
Accounts receivable—where the company enters money received
Accounts payable—where the company enters its bills and pays money it owes
General ledger—the company's "books"
Billing—where the company produces invoices to clients/customers
Stock/inventory—where the company keeps control of its inventory
Purchase order—where the company orders inventory
Sales order—where the company records customer orders for the supply of inventory
Bookkeeping—where the company records collection and payment
Financial close management — where accounting teams verify and adjust account balances at the end of a designated time period

Non-core modules
Debt collection—where the company tracks attempts to collect overdue bills (sometimes part of accounts receivable)
Electronic payment processing
Expense—where employee business-related expenses are entered
Inquiries—where the company looks up information on screen without any edits or additions
Payroll—where the company tracks salary, wages, and related taxes
Reports—where the company prints out data
Timesheet—where professionals (such as attorneys and consultants) record time worked so that it can be billed to clients
 Purchase requisition—where requests for purchase orders are made, approved and tracked
Reconciliation—compares records from parties at both sides of transactions for consistency
Drill down
Journals
Departmental accounting
Support for value added taxation
Calculation of statutory holdback
Late payment reminders
Bank feed integration
Document attachment system
Document/Journal approval system

Note that vendors may use differing names for these modules.

Implementation 
In many cases, implementation (i.e. the installation and configuration of the system at the client) can be a bigger consideration than the actual software chosen when it comes down to the total cost of ownership for the business. Most mid-market and larger applications are sold exclusively through resellers, developers, and consultants. Those organizations generally pass on a license fee to the software vendor and then charge the client for installation, customization, and support services. Clients can normally count on paying roughly 50-200% of the price of the software in implementation and consulting fees.

Other organizations sell to, consult with, and support clients directly, eliminating the reseller. Accounting software provides many benefits such as speed up the information retrieval process, bring efficiency in Bank reconciliation process, automatically prepare Value Added TAX (VAT) / Goods and Services TAX (GST), and, perhaps most importantly, provide the opportunity to see the real-time state of the company’s financial position.

Types

Personal accounting 

Personal accounting software is simple in design and is used mostly for individuals. Some activities that it supports are accounts payable-type accounting transactions, managing budgets, and simple account reconciliation. It is relatively inexpensive compared to the other accounting options. One of the more common uses of personal accounting software is for tax preparation. This software is used to file tax returns in a format suitable with the Internal Revenue Service. An example of such software would be TurboTax.

Low-end market 
At the low-end of the business markets, inexpensive applications software allows most general business accounting functions to be performed. Suppliers frequently serve a single national market, while larger suppliers offer separate solutions in each national market.

Many of the low end products are characterized by being "single-entry" products, as opposed to double-entry systems seen in many businesses. Some products have considerable functionality but are not considered GAAP or IFRS/FASB compliant. Some low-end systems do not have adequate security nor audit trails.

Mid-market 
The mid-market covers a wide range of business software that may be capable of serving the needs of multiple national accountancy standards and allow accounting in multiple currencies.

In addition to general accounting functions, the software may include integrated or add-on management information systems, and may be oriented towards one or more markets, for example with integrated or add-on project accounting modules.

Software applications in this market typically include the following features:

 Industry-standard robust databases
 Industry-standard reporting tools
 Tools for configuring or extending the application (e.g. an SDK), access to program code.

High-end market 

The most complex and expensive business accounting software is frequently part of an extensive suite of software often known as enterprise resource planning (ERP) software.

These applications typically have a very long implementation period, often greater than six months. In many cases, these applications are simply a set of functions which require significant integration, configuration and customization to even begin to resemble an accounting system.

Many freeware high-end open-source accounting software are available online these days which aim to change the market dynamics. Most of these software solutions are web-based.

The advantage of a high-end solution is that these systems are designed to support individual company specific processes, as they are highly customizable and can be tailored to exact business requirements. This usually comes at a significant cost in terms of money and implementation time.

Hybrid solutions 
As technology improves, software vendors have been able to offer increasingly advanced software at lower prices. This software is suitable for companies at multiple stages of growth. Many of the features of mid-market and high-end software (including advanced customization and extremely scalable databases) are required even by small businesses as they open multiple locations or grow in size. Additionally, with more and more companies expanding overseas or allowing workers to home office, many smaller clients have a need to connect multiple locations. Their options are to employ software-as-a-service or another application that offers them similar accessibility from multiple locations over the internet.

SaaS accounting software 
With the advent of faster computers and internet connections, accounting software companies have been able to create accounting software which is paid for on a monthly recurring charge instead of a larger upfront license fee (software as a service - SaaS). The rate of adoption of this new business model has increased steadily to the point where legacy players have been forced to come out with their own online versions.

Cloud Accounting Software 
Cloud Accounting Software is where financial information can be accessed from any device connected to the Internet at any time even though the financial data itself is located at a centralized computer. This differs from more traditional accounting software as it is restricted to a certain computer or system of computers and that accounting information can not be easily accessed from other devices. Some reasons cloud accounting software is preferred by users is there is no need to worry about maintenance or hardware system upgrades, it can reduce overall costs, and that a user can gain access from multiple locations. One of the primary reasons cloud accounting software is not being used is the threat of the security of the data. Some of the more common examples of Cloud Accounting Software include Cloud Elements, IBM App Connect, IFTTT, and Zapier.

Data Privacy and Security 
Privacy in cloud computing is in constant risk of disclosure when in possession of a third party. Factors resulting in distrust of privacy include unauthorization, unpredictability, and nonconformity. Security threats vary from different cloud environments and interactions and can cause significant risks that must be considered specific to that origin. Unauthorization is a threat stemming from allowing third party organizations to handle an individual's data and the user not having full control. Lack of user control is the effect of keeping data in the cloud, as opposed to one's own local host, and increases user's level of unpredictability. Legislative complexity impacts cloud computing in where the data is being stored and the laws that data in that location, or locations, must follow. While cloud computing and traditional IT environments may pose differing privacy issues, the security controls are generally similar.

See also 

Accounting
Index of accounting articles
Comparison of accounting software
Double-entry bookkeeping system
E-accounting
Enterprise resource planning
Tax compliance software

References

External links